Romesh T. Wadhwani (born 1947/48) is an Indian-American billionaire businessman, the founder, chairman and CEO of Symphony Technology Group (STG), a private equity firm for software, Internet and technology services companies.

Early life
Romesh T. Wadhwani was born in Karachi, British India (now Pakistan), and his family moved to India following its independence post-1947. He is of Sindhi origin. He contracted polio at age of 2 and had difficulty getting admission in school.  He received a bachelor's degree from the IIT Bombay, and master's and PhD degrees in electrical engineering from Carnegie Mellon University.

Career
For ten years, Wadhwani was the founder, chairman, and CEO of two companies, one (American Robot Corporation) specializing in software and solutions for computer-integrated manufacturing and the other (Compu-Guard Corporation) in technology-enabled energy management.

Wadhwani was then the founder, chairman, and CEO of Aspect Development, Inc., from its startup in 1991 to its acquisition in 1999 by i2 Technologies for $9.3 billion in stock.

Wadhwani is the executive chairman of Symphony Teleca Corporation, MSC Software Inc, Symphony Health Solutions Inc, and Shopzilla Inc, and is on the board of Information Resources Inc. Wadhwani is the largest limited partner in each of Symphony's private equity funds, the third of which closed at $870 million.

Together with his brother, Sunil Wadhwani, he has founded Wadhwani Institute for Artificial Intelligence in Mumbai to develop artificial intelligence solutions for public good.

Philanthropy
Wadhwani is on the board of trustees of the John F. Kennedy Center for the Performing Arts and the Center for Strategic and International Studies, both in Washington, D.C.

He established the Wadhwani Foundation for economic development in emerging economies, with an initial focus on India. Initiatives in India include the National Entrepreneurship Network, which has established programs to enable growth-centric entrepreneurship at over 500 universities and colleges; a skills college network to help train and place large numbers of young adults in vocational jobs; an opportunities network for the disabled; and a research initiative in biosciences and biotechnology to help create jobs through innovation. The Foundation has launched a US-India policy initiative, with Rick Inderfurth, previously Assistant Secretary of State, as the Wadhwani Chair at the Center for Strategic and International Studies, a policy think tank in Washington D.C. and Hemant Singh, former Indian Ambassador to Japan, as the head of the Wadhwani program at ICRIER, a major policy institute in Delhi. Wadhwani won the India Abroad Award for Lifetime Achievement in 2013.

In 2012, he inaugurated a new research centre at the National Centre for Biological Sciences (NCBS) in Bangalore, named after his late mother, Shanta Wadhwani.

Personal life
He is married to Kathleen "Kathy" Wadhwani, and they live in Palo Alto, California.

They have one daughter, Melina, who married Patrick Carey in 2011. Carey works as head of sales operations at Symphony Talent.

Honours
Wadhwani was awarded an honorary doctorate by the IIT Bombay in August 2018.

References

1940s births
American computer businesspeople
American billionaires
Carnegie Mellon University College of Engineering alumni
Giving Pledgers
21st-century philanthropists
IIT Bombay alumni
Living people
American chief executives
American company founders
American people of Sindhi descent
Indian billionaires
Indian emigrants to the United States